The Oshawa Military and Industrial Museum is an accredited Canadian Forces Museum located in Oshawa, Ontario, Canada. The museum, more commonly known as The Ontario Regiment (RCAC) "Ferret Club", was founded in Oshawa in 1980 and has grown to become the Historic Vehicle Section of the Ontario Regiment Museum.

The museum's maintainers are a group of volunteer military vehicle enthusiasts. The group includes civilians as well as several current and former members of the RCAC, and other units of the Canadian Army and the Canadian Armed Forces (CAF).

Description
Almost every vehicle in the museum's collection is operational or in some state of repair or restoration. Many vehicles, including the vintage Sherman Mark IV, Chaffee, M60 and Sheridan tanks, armoured personnel carriers, trucks and jeeps, are frequently driven in parades and other ceremonial activities involving the Ontario Regiment or other units of the CAF.

The funding required to restore, maintain, and fuel the museum’s historic vehicle collection and static displays is provided entirely by volunteers—current and former members of the Canadian Forces, veterans, cadets and civilians. The museum raises some of its operating funds by providing the use of some vehicles for select recognizable Canadian and international television or film productions. Many vehicles in the museum's collection are visible from Stevenson Rd N, the road leading into the south field of the Oshawa Executive Airport.

Historical Development
The museum was founded in 1980 as the Ontario Regiment Ferret Club. Housed in a garage in north Oshawa, the collection began with nine fully restored surplus Canadian Ferret armoured cars.

The club was relocated to a disused dairy farm on Oshawa's 8th Concession for much of the 1980s before finding a permanent home on the Oshawa Airport lands, one of the many British Commonwealth Air Training Plan sites for allied pilots during the Second World War.

Collections

Historic Vehicle Section (Ferret Club)
The museum's collection contains over 70 vehicles, including jeeps, carry-alls, carriers, tanks and a motorcycle. Aside from fully restored Bren Gun Carrier and M24 Chaffee, a pair of M4A2(76)W HVSS, and one unrestored Centurion, there are also a number of foreign-operated vehicles including a Scania HLVW prototype.

Other highlights of the collection include two M60A3s and two M551A1 Sheridans. A number of ex-US Army M113A2s are maintained and driven regularly, as are the M113C&R Lynx. Softskin vehicles include a number of examples of different Canadian military pattern vehicles, as well as many jeeps and examples of the Dodge M37. Post-war trucks are also on display.

Static Display Section

The museum's Static Display Section consists of uniforms, medals, photographs, diaries, historical books and artifacts relevant to the history of the Regiment, the Royal Canadian Armoured Corps, and the Canadian Army from the 1850s to the present day. These artifacts are displayed in diorama settings depicting their era of use. Among the medals displayed include those of past members of the Ontario Regiment, including the original Order of Canada awarded to its longest-serving Honorary Colonel, RS (Sam) McLaughlin.

References

Further reading
 Bob English, "Ferrets and Lynxes and Sherman tanks, oh my!" Globe and Mail, May 25, 2006.
 Charles MacGregor, "Wartime auto history preserved in Oshawa," Toronto Star, November 11, 2006.1

External links
 The Ontario Regiment (RCAC) Museum, Oshawa, Ontario
 CFB Borden Military Museum and Major-General FF Worthington Memorial Park
 The Ontario Regiment (RCAC)  - Official website
 Royal Canadian Armoured Corps Association (Cavalry)

Military and war museums in Canada
Buildings and structures in Oshawa
Transport museums in Ontario
Museums in the Regional Municipality of Durham
Tank museums